State Route 299 (SR 299) is a  state highway in the Cumberland Plateau region of East Tennessee.

Route description

SR 299 begins in Cumberland County in Westel at an intersection with US 70/SR 1. It winds it way north through the community as Westel Road to have an interchange with, and then run concurrently with, I-40 at exit 338. Part of this interchange is located in Roane County. SR 299 heads northeast through wooded areas as it passes the airport before crossing into Morgan County. SR 299 then passes through Pine Orchard before going through farmland and rural areas to enter Oakdale and become W Main Street. It passes through town before crossing a very tall bridge over the Emory River just shortly before coming to an end at an intersection with SR 328.

Major intersections

References

299
Transportation in Cumberland County, Tennessee
Transportation in Morgan County, Tennessee